Denni may refer to:

 A diminutive of the female given name Denise
 Denni Rocha dos Santos, a Brazilian professional footballer usually known as Denni

See also
 Denise (disambiguation)